State Highway 27 is located in Kerr and Kendall counties and runs parallel to Interstate 10.

History
 SH 27 was a route proposed in late July 1917 to run from Ft. Stockton to El Paso. On March 18, 1918, a section from San Antonio to Sonora was added. On August 21, 1923, it became one continuous route from San Antonio to Balmorhea. Everything west of Balmorhea became a portion of SH 3. The section from Kerrville to Bandera was cancelled, and the section from Bandera to San Antonio was renumbered as part of SH 81. SH 27 was rerouted southeast to Boerne replacing a portion of SH 41. In 1927, it was cosigned with U.S. Highway 290. On May 20, 1931, SH 27 was extended west over a portion of SH 3, which was rerouted. On June 20, 1933 (map was on June 15), the western portion was reassigned northwest from Ft. Stockton, replacing SH 192 and the northern portion of SH 17, while the old alignment between Ft. Stockton and west of Balmorhea renumbered as SH 196. SH 27 also extended southeast to Port O'Connor, replacing portions of SH 81 and SH 29.  In 1934, SH 27 was no longer cosigned with US 290 (which was rerouted) east of near Junction but was still cosigned with it from Junction to Ft. Stockton. The section from Fort Stockton to New Mexico was codesignated with U.S. Route 285 by 1934. The section from San Antonio to Port Lavaca was codesignated with U.S. Route 87. On September 26, 1939, all cosigned sections were removed in favor of their U.S. Highway designations, the section from Port Lavaca to SH 185 was redesignated as an extension of SH 238, and the section from SH 185 to Port O'Connor was redesignated as an extension of SH 185. On March 18, 1975, the section from Junction to Mountain Home was removed as it was replaced by I-10.

Route description
SH 27 begins at exit 488 on I-10 in Kerr County north of the town of Mountain Home.  The highway heads southeast and east from I-10 to an intersection with SH 41 in Mountain Home.  The highway continues to the southeast, generally paralleling to the south of I-10, to an intersection with RM 479.  It continues heading southeast until it reaches an intersection with SH 39 in Ingram.  From this intersection, SH 27 heads east towards Kerrville.  In Kerrville, the highway has intersections with FM 1338 and RM 783 before a junction with SH 16.  As the highway leaves Kerrville, it passes by Kerrville Municipal Airport.  SH 27 begins to head to the east as it enters
Center Point, where it has an intersection with RM 480.  The highway continues on to the east with a slight turn to the northeast as it enters Comfort.  The highway intersects RM 473 and US 87 in Comfort.  It has a short concurrency with US Bus 87 until SH 27 ends at an interchange with I-10 southeast of Comfort.

Major intersections

References

027
027
Transportation in Kerr County, Texas
Transportation in Kendall County, Texas